Haughton Lennox (February 28, 1850 – July 26, 1927) was a Canadian politician.

Born in Innisfil Township, Canada West, the son of William Lennox and Maria Haughton, Lennox was educated at the Public and Grammar Schools of Barrie. A lawyer, he was first elected to the House of Commons of Canada for the Ontario electoral district of Simcoe South in the general elections of 1900. A Conservative, he was re-elected in 1904, 1908, and 1911.

References
 
 The Canadian Parliament; biographical sketches and photo-engravures of the senators and members of the House of Commons of Canada. Being the tenth Parliament, elected November 3, 1904

1850 births
1927 deaths
Conservative Party of Canada (1867–1942) MPs
Members of the House of Commons of Canada from Ontario